Sakoli Assembly constituency  is one of the 288 Maharashtra Vidhan Sabha (legislative assembly) constituencies in Maharashtra state in central India. This constituency is one of the three constituencies located in the Bhandara district.

Sakoli is part of the Bhandara-Gondiya Lok Sabha constituency along with five other Vidhan Sabha segments, namely Bhandara and Tumsar in Bhandara district and Gondiya, Arjuni Morgaon and Tirora in the Gondia district.

Members of Legislative assembly

See also
 Sakoli
 List of constituencies of Maharashtra Vidhan Sabha

References

Assembly constituencies of Maharashtra